Kangaroo (also known as The Australian Story) is a 1952 American Western film directed by Lewis Milestone. It was the first Technicolor film filmed on location in Australia. Milestone called it "an underrated picture."

Kangaroo was remade in Africa as The Jackals in 1967.

Plot summary 
In 1900 Australia, Dell McGuire worries about her missing father Michael.  She asks Trooper Len for help.

Michael is drunk in Sydney, staying at a boarding house. He meets Richard Connor (Peter Lawford), a desperate young man trying to find the money to return home to America. Michael is looking for his long-lost son, Dennis, whom McGuire had abandoned to an orphanage as a child, a deed for which he now deeply blames himself.

Later that night, Connor attempts to rob John Gamble (Richard Boone) outside a gambling house, but after he finds him equally broke, he is talked into assisting him in robbing the establishment, during which the owner is shot.

Connor and Gamble make off with the loot, stopping at the boarding house to get Connor's gear, whereupon McGuire, still drunk, pursues his "son" down the street until he collapses. They find on his person information regarding his extensive station (for which he was trying to secure loans in Sydney) and his boat ticket, and decide to pose as his business partners to get on the boat and away to hide out with him in the Outback.

The next day, the now sober McGuire does not remember anything, and is at first suspicious of them, until he finds he has the £500 they claimed to have paid him for cattle (planted on him from the stolen loot). Along the way - first by boat, then by horse - they subtly drop hints that Connor (now calling himself Dennis Connor) may be McGuire's lost son, without letting on that McGuire himself had talked about his missing offspring. In this way, Connor and Gamble hope to gain possession of McGuire's station.

Arriving at the station, they are both smitten by his daughter Dell (Maureen O'Hara), but held in some suspicion by the local trooper Len (Chips Rafferty), who has been Dell's local beau.

Gamble does his best to scotch a budding attraction between Dell and Connor, because it will spoil the plan to pass him off as her lost brother.

Biding their time, both to develop their plan and hide out from the law, they end up helping the station get back on its feet, rescuing stray cattle, heading off a stampede, and culminating in a daring repair of an out-of-control windmill during a windstorm.

McGuire is finally convinced that Connor is his son, and seeing the romantic interest of his daughter in him, tells her his conclusion. Overhearing her despair at this news, Connor feels he must confess, and Gamble sees their plan fail on the brink of success because of the annoying conscience of his partner.

Having not only confessed his true identity, but also the fact that both he and his companion are wanted in the murder of the gambling house owner, Connor and Gamble are forced to flee the station, with trooper Len in hot pursuit.

When Len catches up to them, Gamble is about to shoot him when Connor pulls the gun away with a bullwhip. The two partners in crime now have a vicious bullwhip fight.

Gamble retrieves the gun and shoots at Connor, but Len fatally shoots Gamble. Len then takes Connor back to the McGuire station, where he recovers from his injuries, being promised clemency for saving Len's life, and with the promise of a future with Dell.

Cast 
 Maureen O'Hara as Dell McGuire
 Peter Lawford as Richard Connor
 Finlay Currie as Michael McGuire
 Richard Boone as John W. Gamble
 Chips Rafferty as Trooper "Len" Leonard
 Letty Craydon as Kathleen, McGuire's Housekeeper
 Charles 'Bud' Tingwell as Matt
 Henry Murdoch as Piper
Ron Whelan as Fenner
John Fegan as Burke
Guy Doleman as Pleader
Reg Collins as Ship's officer
Frank Ransom as Burton
Marshall Crosby as Priest
Clyde Combo as Aborigine stockman
Reg Wyckham as Archibald, flophouse clerk
George Sympson-Little as Bluey

Development

Script
In November 1948 20th Century Fox announced they wanted to make a films set in Australia at the turn of the century called The Australian Story. It would be based on an original story by Martin Berkley and produced by Robert Bassler. The film would be made using Fox funds "frozen" by the Australian government under post-war currency restrictions. Tyrone Power was the expected star, as he had made a number of romantic adventures for Fox shot on location outside Hollywood such as Prince of Foxes. Reports said "the picture will be themed in the documentary manner by events that happened at the turn of the century." Australian reports said the film may be about the construction of the transcontinental telegraph.

Lewis Milestone, who eventually directed the film, later said "I suppose the idea of making it originated in the Fox sales department: they'd accumulated a lot of money in Australia and I suppose the only way they could move the money was to reinvest it there."

In April 1949 it was reported "script writers at the Fox Studios are frantically reading Australian novels to get background material for a film courageously called "The Australian Story"."

In June 1949 Fox said Dudley Nichols was going to write the script from Berkley's story, and may also direct. However by July Norman Reilly Raine was working on the script which had also been known as The Land Down Under and Sundowner. In 1949 November Fox said the film was going to be called The Land Down Under, with Power to star and Bassler to produce. By this stage Fox said the film would be about a bushranger who pretends to be the long lost son of a rich land owner.

In December 1949 associate producer Robert Snody and art director Lee Kirk arrived in Sydney to line up locations. By then the film was called The Bushranger although Snody insisted it was more of a family saga.

In January 1950 Fox said the project would be an "actor drama" called The Bushranger produced by Robert Snody and written by Norman Reilly Raine about a family running a cattle station in the northwest circa 1895–1900.  By that month Charles Clarke was announced as cinematographer. Also that month Fox said they would make the film in Technicolour, and that three writers were working on the script. Filming was expected to begin in October.

Other titles to the story were The Australian Story, The Bushranger, The Land Down Under and Sundowner.

An early draft of the film reportedly featured reference to hordes of kangaroos wiping out a town, but this was deleted after input from the Australian crew.

Director
In June 1950 Fox announced that Louis King would direct the film under a new five-year contract with the studio. However the following month it was announced that Lewis Milestone would direct the movie. Milestone left for Australia on 15 August 1950. When he arrived, Milestone spoke highly to the Australian media about the quality of other Australian-shot films, The Overlanders and Bitter Springs.

Casting
Tyrone Power was the first star linked with the project. In February 1949 Hedda Hopper reported that Fox were pursuing Cary Grant and later report claimed Gregory Peck was also considered. In April 1949 Fox said Jean Peters would play the female lead.

In November 1949 Fox announced that Tyrone Power would play the male lead if he liked the script. "It might be a good deal", said Power. "I've never been to Australia." By December it was reported Power was off the picture. In May 1950 there were reports the lead would go to a new Fox contract player like William Lundigan or Hugh Beaumount. In July 1950 it was reported that  Power dropped out to appear in a stage version of Mister Roberts in London.

In July 1950 Milestone said none of the four leads had been cast; he expressed interest in Richard Widmark or "a British star" as the hero, Jean Simmons as the female lead and Errol Flynn as "the bushranger"; the fourth lead part was the station owner, for which Milestone wanted an actor around 60 years of age. He had been told about Chips Rafferty and wanted to test him, and estimated that there were about 25 roles in the movie available for Australians to play. "Station hands, townspeople, tavern keepers, barmaids, stage coach drivers, passengers, atmosphere players", he said.  Milestone added:
The story concerns a group of people living on stations about 300 miles north-west of Sydney. If necessary we will rewrite the play to lit Australian conditions. I want Kangaroo to be a true dramatic portrait of life in Australia in the 1880s. We'll decide the district for filming within a month of arrival. We'll build sets on location and take interior shots in Ealing Studios. We expect to spend six months altogether in Australia. We'll engage experts and technical directors there.
He estimated the budget would be £900,000.

In August 1950 Fox announced they were borrowing Peter Lawford from MGM to play the male lead. By the end of the month the female lead was given to Constance Smith, who had just appeared in Fox's The Mudlark., (J Arthur Rank reportedly would not loan out Simmons.) In September the second male lead went to Richard Boone who had recently appeared in The Halls of Montezuma directed by Milestone. .

Then Smith was assigned to star in The 13th Letter (1951) and her role was taken by Maureen O'Hara. O'Hara wrote in her memoirs that "I loved the script and asked Darryl Zanuck to cast me in the picture." She added that Zanuck "had already cast his then-current girlfriend in the part but dropped her from the picture as soon as I asked for the part." O'Hara's marriage was breaking down at the time and she says she had decided to divorce her second husband but was talked out of it by Mary and John Ford just before she left for Australia on 17 November 1950.

Finlay Currie was the last of the four principals to be cast. He had recently made several films for Fox including The Black Rose and The Mudlark. When asked about Australia films Currie said, "I   believe your own  producers have concentrated too much on   background   and   not   enough on story.  That is a pity. Even when your settings are interesting   they can't compensate   for   a   poor   script.   For   it  is   the script that   brings background  alive.  I   think   a   really   good   story   with  an Australian setting should   make   a  very   good   picture,   and   we   in   the   unit  are all hoping that is what Kangaroo  will   give   you.  Producer-director   Lewis   Milestone  knows what he wants before   he   starts, and   that   is   half   the   battle   of   production. Having him out   here   is   a  definite   and   important   gesture   to   the vast   potentialities   of   film   production  in   your   country."  

In December 1950 Hedda Hopper said Rod Cameron was a good chance of being cast "if he can travel".

In December 1950 Letty Craydon was cast as Maureen O'Hara's housekeeper under a monthly contract with a daily option up until six weeks. She was chosen after her performance as Sister Josephine in the play Bonaventura. "It will be a wonderful break for me and of tremendous educational value", said Craydon. "I looked over my part the other day, and I love it, particularly as it has a touch of Irish about it. I have been studying it hard and getting ready to leave. My frocks have been prepared, and I have tried most of them on. It will be marvellous working with Maureen O'Hara and Peter Lawford; but, I'm not a star, and I doubt whether my name will be
in big lights."

The cast and crew went to Sydney via Hawaii where they had a six-day stop over in Honolulu. "Everywhere we go we get mobbed by teenagers", said Boone. Of course they're after Peter, and I get the backwash. I don't care so much for being hugged, kissed, petted and squeezed by hundreds of screaming youngsters."

Preproduction

Script revisions
Milestone says he was "saddled" with a "weak story" by the studio. When he arrived in Australia he discussed the story with members of the Sydney Journalists Club, apologising for the story and asking for their help in tracking down locations. He was contacted by journalist and writer Brian Penton who offered the director the use of material from his books Landtakers and Inheritors. Milestone loved the books and felt "they would make marvellous pictures of their type."

When screenwriter Harry Kleiner arrived in Sydney he and Milestone tried to persuade Fox via long-distance telephone "to scrap the damned scenario they'd sent me out with, which was a joke, and substitute the Penton books" arguing it was better to make an Australian film written by an Australian.

Fox refused. However Milestone used some material from the novels in the final script. He said "I fell back to my second line trenches and resolved to narrow down the human story to the minimum and concentrate on the animals plight in the drought. That way we came out of the venture with something whereas otherwise we would have had nothing."

Among Milestone's additions was a bullwhip duel between the two leads. It was one of several set pieces in the new script, others including a corroboree, a dust storm, a battle with a windmill, a cattle stampede and a cattle drive.

In September it was reported that:
Australian authors working in the United States appear to have led Hollywood up the garden path with exciting tales about Australia. At present four American writers, assisted by an Australian, are working on the script... to eliminate inaccuracies. The first working script for Kangaroo should be ready within a week. It will be somewhat different from the original story. Authors of the first script let their heads go in a big way. They described kangaroos so big and ferocious that in dry weather they stormed bush homesteads in thousands and carried off the children... A hasty revisal of the story is now being made to eliminate the "too fierce" kangaroos and other inaccuracies.
Kleiner called the rewritten script "a story about a man in conflict with his conscience. The people of the cattle country at the turn of the century provide the background."

O'Hara later wrote "I was heartbroken when I was given the revised shooting script in Sydney and saw how it had been ruined... Milestone had rewritten Martin Barkley's story and made it about a man and his conscience struggling with the question, 'Are you a sinner if you only think about sinning or do you actually have to commit the sin to be guilty?' It was the worst piece of rubbish I had ever read.  He had destroyed a good, straightforward western."

O'Hara says she contacted her lawyer and tried to get out of the film but was told "I would be creating a huge political incident if I walked off the picture. I had no choice but to do it or be in serious trouble." She added "although I hated every minute of the work I absolutely loved Australia and the people."

Port Augusta
Milestone decided to relocate the film from New South Wales to Port Augusta, South Australia feeling the New South Wales locations looked no different from places in Southern Arizona and California. Fox built a base at Port Augusta

In September Milestone said he had originally planned on a 61-day shoot but now planned to be in the country for seven months.

Shooting was to commence on October 15, 1950 but this date had to be pushed back to November due to unexpected rain, lack of material and contractual requirements of Finlay Currie. Housing for cast and crew in Port Augusta was not ready. The producers negotiated with unions to try and get them to work six days a week. Milestone wanted to hold off filming to give a greater impression of drought.

In addition, the script was being rewritten and the action was relocated from the 1880s to 1900. Originally the film opened with Connor (Peter Lawford) and his bushranger friend Gamble (Boone) holding up a stage coach on a lonely road where he met Dell (O'Hara) who was a passenger. The opening scene was rewritten to be set in Sydney. 
.
The producer also revealed that he was forced to have all costumes made in Hollywood. "We simply couldn't find any theatrical tailors in Australia,'
he explained.

The studio also had to ship a large quantity of technical equipment from Hollywood because it felt the equipment in Australia was out of date. "Costs are piling up so fast, what with delays and other problems, that we really lave no idea what the final total will be", said producer Bassler.

Bassler said he wanted to shoot a sequence where water starved kangaroos attacked me. "The sequence will compare with any of the great cattle and horse stampedes filmed,"" he said. "It will be the most unique thing ever put on the screen. It could become the most talked-about scene in the history of movies. I hate the thought of giving it up and only hope the various Australian Governments will come to my rescue and see that we get our kangaroos."

There was a studio at Pagewood but Milestone said it "ignored" it and "shot right inside houses, saloons, and natural interiors, utilizing as many historical locations as possible; in the country... we used little pubs and places like that, mainly in and around Port Augusta. We also shot on board a coastal ship."

Production was delayed a further ten days when Henry Kleiner had an appendix operation in Sydney.

Production

Sydney
Shooting started in Sydney in November, with work done at Millers Point near the end of the Sydney Harbour Bridge. Scenes where Lawford tries to rob Boone were shot by the sandstone walls of Hickson Street, and the two up sequence was shot over several days at Elizabeth Bay House Milestone said the Australian crew took instructions from his "half dozen key personnel, who ran it like a school. They Aussies blended in fine."

Milestone said "one of the reasons I wanted to concentrate on Sydney's historic landmarks was to emphasize the fact we were actually in Australia: out in the wide open spaces you might as well have been in Arizona."

Zanuckville
Premier Thomas Playford of South Australia donated a housing estate at Port Augusta to the film unit for use of the cast and crew. This estate was dubbed "Zanuckville". It would house up to 150 people. O'Hara arrived in Adelaide from Sydney on November 30, and attended a reception at Government House hosted by Premier Playford. O'Hara said "I have been able to get down to reading my part in the film only during the past two days. I feel it is going to be wonderful. I really hope we will wind up with a 'picture 'which Australia will be proud of as well as us.' They went to Port Pirie then travelled by car to reside at the camp known as Hollywood Park, outside Port Augusta. They were met by a gala celebration.

The press had to downplay reports that Lawford and Boone were unhappy with the flies and heat. The script was continually rewritten and Port Augusta shooting was delayed until Fox approved it. Most publicity of the film focused on O'Hara.

The bulk of outdoor scenes ere shot at the foot of Mount Brown. During shooting, temperatures were very high in Port Augusta, the script was constantly being rewritten, the isolated unit (dubbed "Zanuckville") had trouble sourcing materials, and rain kept occurring at inopportune moments. Filming did not begin at Port Augusta until December 21. and the shooting schedule was constantly revised due to weather. Scenes were also shot at Woolundunga Station. Boat scenes were shot on the Moonta. On the shoot, a Christmas Eve concert was held on location by cast and crew, however Lawford and Boone asked to be excused.

During the production, Peter Lawford had a regular stand in, Noel Johnson, who had to leave during the shoot when his brother was killed in a shooting accident. He was replaced as stand in by Ian Jones, an arts student who had travelled from Melbourne to the unit hoping to find some stunt work. Jones later became a noted writer and director in Australian TV.

Australian heavyweight champion Jack O'Malley played 72 year old Finlay Currie's stand in. A sound technician was paralysed after being bitten by a spider. In January, Tingwell and Rafferty attended the premiere of Bitter Springs in Wilmington, South Australia. An aboriginal dance was especially recreated for the film using aboriginals from Ooldea. It was shot at Spear Creek near Port Augusta. Lawford reportedly lost twelve pounds during the shoot and his hair started to fall out (this stopped when he returned to Hollywood).

In her 2004 autobiography Tis Herself, Maureen O'Hara claimed that Richard Boone and Peter Lawford were "rude and disrespectful to many Australians and to the press as a whole and the Australians came to dislike them both with a passion." She says they were arrested in a "brothel full of beautiful boys" in Sydney, but claims the studio managed to prevent this from being reported by having O'Hara make a personal plea to the press O'Hara recalled "publicity around the picture was remarkable. The Australians were so excited to have us there and were one of the most gracious people I have ever encountered on location." However she says "I cried many nights" during the shoot. "Lawford and Boone were horrible to me even though I had saved both their hides... I still had to fight off a swarm of flies for every mouthful of food. I was even clawed something awful by a cuddly little koala bear during a scheduled photo shoot." O'Hara left by the end of February.

The drought was so bad that Milestone expected to have to film the movie's climactic scene – a downpour – back in Hollywood. The cast and crew attended a "native rain dance" on Saturday night and the next morning it rained. The unit shot the scene over five hours. Filming wrapped on 15 February 1952.

Overall, an estimated £446,000 was spent in South Australia. After the end of the film, various props were auctioned off in March. Over 1,000 people attended.

Postproduction
Milestone said by the time he supervised the first cut "I'd fallen in love with the whole drama of the thing." He said he instructed the music department at Fox to accompany the cattle sequence, his favourite, with a soundtrack of Shostakovitch's Sixth Symphony and called it "really a masterpiece". Milestone says Zanuck enjoyed the sequence but would not let Milestone use the music as they had stolen it for a movie before.

Milestone says Zanuck refused to preview the movie in Los Angeles and sent it out. A few months later, it was sent back after having played badly in the eastern states of the US and Zanuck demanded a new ending.  Milestone says he "volunteered my services because I wanted to rescue as much as the film's quality as I could. But we had to do whatever Mr Zanuck wanted. He can be good but boy oh boy he can also be very very bad." Strong winds on location forced Milestone to rerecord much of the exterior dialogue.

Release
When the movie was released in Australia, initial box office performance was strong, but reviews were bad and business soon tailed off.

Milestone later claimed Boone's character was the basis of Paladin, the character he played in the TV series Have Gun – Will Travel (1957 – 1963). Milestone directed an episode of this show.

Reception
According to one book on Milestone, the director's "handling of the material was interesting in the extent of carrying sound and lack of dialogue to extremes, but the standard of playing was below par."

Another book on the director called it "a curiously divided work, about half formula Western and half fictionalised travelogue" in which the cattle drive sequence "proves as good as anything in Ford's or Hawk's Westerns."

Charles Higham said the movie had "first rate action scenes" including "a drought sequence and a cattle stampede that gave Harry Watt's The Overlanders quite  run for its money", adding the film "once again demonstrated that, as a master of natural environments, Milestone was second to none, capturing the sweat and dust and saddle leather of Australia's outback to perfection."
 
Filmink magazine said that "This film isn't as bad as its reputation (Richard Boone is excellent as Lawford's friend and there's some great visuals), it's just frustrating because it should have been better – it's flabby and goes all over the place, Lawford is a wet fish of a leading man, and it needs more action... It would have been more entertaining if it had embraced being a Western more."

See also
Cinema of Australia

References

Further reading

External links 
 
 
 
Kangaroo at Oz Movies
 
 

1952 films
1952 Western (genre) films
1950s adventure drama films
Films set in 1900
Films set in Sydney
Australian Western (genre) films
20th Century Fox films
Films shot in Sydney
Films shot in Flinders Ranges
Films scored by Sol Kaplan
1952 drama films
Films with screenplays by Harry Kleiner
1950s English-language films
Films directed by Lewis Milestone
American Western (genre) films
1950s American films